The 2017–18 Purdue Boilermakers women's basketball team represents Purdue University during the 2017–18 NCAA Division I women's basketball season. Boilermakers, led by 12th year head coach Sharon Versyp, play their home games at Mackey Arena and were a members of the Big Ten Conference. They finished the season 20–14, 9–7 in Big Ten play to finish in tie for seventh place. They lost in the second round of the Big Ten women's tournament to Rutgers. They received an at-large bid of the Women's National Invitation Tournament where defeated IUPUI and Ball State in the first and second rounds before losing to their Big Ten member and their rival Indiana in the third round.

Roster

Schedule

|-
! colspan="9" style="background:#000000; color:white;"| Exhibition

|-
! colspan="9" style="background:#000000; color:white;"| Non-conference regular season

|-
! colspan="9" style="background:#000000; color:white;"| Big Ten conference season

|-
! colspan="9" style="background:#000000; color:white;"| Big Ten Women's Tournament

|-
! colspan="9" style="background:#000000; color:white;"| WNIT

Rankings

See also
2017–18 Purdue Boilermakers men's basketball team

References

Purdue Boilermakers women's basketball seasons
Purdue
Purdue
Purdue
Purdue